Alireza Hadadifar (born August 6, 1987) is an Iranian footballer who plays for Zob Ahan in the Iran Pro League.

Club career
Hadahifar was with Zob Ahan in 2008.

Club career statistics

 Assist Goals

References

1987 births
Living people
Zob Ahan Esfahan F.C. players
Iranian footballers
Association football midfielders